Established in 2005, Burning Shore Press is a publisher of serious "underground" literature and is based in Long Beach, California. It has thus far published the novel Heaping Stones, by Rob Woodard, and the play Don Giovanni, by Dan Fante, and Songs From The Shooting Gallery, the debut book of poetry from New York-based writer Tony O'Neill, Scheduled publications includeWhat Love Is, Rob Woodard's second novel, The Boiler Room, Dan Fante's acclaimed first play, and King of Long Beach, Rob Woodard's first collection of poetry.

External links
 Burning Shore Press
 Review of Don Giovanni by Dan Fante on 3am Magazine
Review of Heaping Stones by Rob Woodard on Scarecrow
 Rob Woodard's Poetry on the Laura Hird Website
Scarecrow Magazine Featuring Works by Burning Shore Press Authors

Companies based in Long Beach, California
Book publishing companies based in California
Publishing companies established in 2005